Sheldon Schrager (born 1931) is an American film producer most notable for producing The Karate Kid Part III and The Prince of Tides.  He was at one time married to director Norman Taurog's daughter, Patricia.  From 1978 to 1996, Schrager was married to Aliza Gur.

External links
 

1931 births
Living people
American film producers